Memphis Public Libraries (MPL) is a public library system serving Shelby County, Tennessee.

Memphis Public Libraries has a yearly circulation of 250,000 items and serves 400,000 patrons a year. The library has 18 branches located throughout the city of Memphis and surrounding areas, offering up to 3,400 programs to the public each year.

Memphis Public Libraries has been recognized for its commitment to being a key center for both cultural and intellectual growth. In 1998, former director C. Lamar Wallis was lauded for his dedication to intellectual freedom with the Tennessee Library Association's Freedom of Information Award. In 2007 MPL was awarded the National Medal for Museum and Library Service by the Institute of Museum and Library Services.

WYPL, the library-run radio station, has been recognized by the American Foundation for the Blind as the Model Radio Reading Service.

History

1880s: Founding 
The history of Memphis Public Libraries began in the 1880s, when the city received $75,000 from Frederick Cossitt to build a public library on a plot of land near the Mississippi River. With the city promising funds for operations, Cossitt’s gift was used entirely on the construction of the library, resulting in an elaborate Romanesque design by architect L.B. Wheeler.

However, when the library opened on April 12, 1893, it was soon made clear that the city government lacked funds for books; upon its grand opening, the library's shelves were empty. Memphians acted quickly, holding fundraisers and events that would eventually fill the Cossitt Library with books and research materials.

1900s to 1990s: Growth and Change 
In March 1925, Jesse Cunningham was hired to serve as former library director Charles Dutton Johnston’s successor. A graduate from the New York State Library School, Cunningham introduced a number of new standards to Memphis. In 1931 Cunningham established libraries were established in Shelby County schools, and a bookmobile began to service up to fifteen rural communities. By 1939  a library branch for African Americans was built on Vance Avenue, which has since been named for longtime Vance resident and civil rights activist, Cornelia Crenshaw.

Desegregation 

Not long after the construction of the Highland branch and main library in 1951 and 1955, respectively, C. Lamar Wallis was brought on after Cunningham's retirement in 1958. Under Wallis's leadership a branch was built in nearly every section of the county. In 1973, it was decided that city and county governments would jointly fund local libraries, marking the creation of the Memphis/Shelby County Public Library system.

Despite advancements, library facilities remained racially segregated, leading African-American accountant Jesse H. Turner to sue the Memphis Public in 1958. 

Sit-in demonstrations were also held by black college students. On March 20, 1960  students sat in at the Central Library and the Cossitt  Reference Library.
They were arrested and jailed. This event, combined with Turner’s lawsuit, led to the desegregation of all public libraries in October 1960. 

Controversy during Wallis's tenure continued; in 1969 he gained national attention for refusing to remove Phillip Roth's novel Portnoy's Complaint against the mayor's objections. This along with his call to desegregate Memphis's public libraries led Wallis to receive the Tennessee Library Association's Freedom of Information Award in 1998.

Judith A. Drescher: First Female Director 
Judith A. Drescher was brought on in 1985 as the sixth library director, and the first female library director in Memphis. She exercised the system’s belief that libraries are a core information source for the community by bringing underserved areas library services via mobile units. Additionally, she oversaw the construction of the Cordova and East Shelby branches.

2000s to Present 
In 2001, the Benjamin L. Hooks Central Library opened to the public. The impressive new addition to the Memphis Public Library system featured a multi-story hub comprising a large children’s section, space for communal gatherings, reading rooms, computer training labs, and more. To this day the Benjamin L. Hooks branch continues to be a source of innovation in the community, with its recent addition of teen learning lab CLOUD901.

Programs and Services 
Since its inception in 1893, the Memphis Public Library system has been characterized by a strong commitment to community outreach and engagement that spans beyond its extensive catalog of materials. In 2007 Memphis Public Libraries was awarded the National Medal for Museum and Library Service by the Institute of Museum and Library Services (IMLS) for "extraordinary programs and involvement with the community." In 2021, it became the first library to be awarded the National Medal for Museum and Library Service twice.

CLOUD901 
Opened in 2015, CLOUD901 is a learning lab with facilities including editing and mixing stations, video production labs and 3D printers, among a number of performance and study areas. CLOUD901 is located in the Benjamin L. Hooks Central Library.

Second Editions Bookstore 
Second Editions is a used bookstore that offers a wide selection of preowned books, CDs, vinyl, DVDs, and audiobooks. Its extensive collection is offered at bargain prices, a portion of which are put toward Memphis Public Libraries. Though Second Editions’ main location is in the Benjamin L. Hooks Central Library, bargain books and materials are readily available at every branch.

WYPL 
WYPL (89.3 FM) is a non-commercial radio station that provides an open radio reading service to patrons. Book readings, author interviews, and both local and international news programming are among the station's offerings. The wide array of broadcasts spans from Eye On Vision, a program featuring doctors' input on the latest research in the field of vision and eye care, to AfricaLink, which provides insight into the latest developments in African news. The station's diverse and quality content has led it to be selected as the Model Radio Reading Service by the American Foundation for the Blind.

Branches 
Memphis Public Libraries operates 18 branches throughout Shelby County, including the main Benjamin L. Hooks Central Library branch located in East Memphis.

References

External links



Education in Memphis, Tennessee
Public libraries in Tennessee